Arnoldo Alberto Iguarán Zúñiga (born 18 January 1957), also known as El Guajiro, is a Colombian former professional footballer who played as a forward. He earned 68 caps for the Colombia national team between 1979 and 1993, playing at the 1990 FIFA World Cup and two Copa América tournaments. With 25 international goals, he was the nation's sole top scorer of all time until Radamel Falcao tied him in 2015.

Club career
Born in Riohacha, Iguarán started and ended his club football career with Cúcuta Deportivo. He spent 12 years at Millonarios, and won the Colombian league in 1987 and 1988 with the club. In 13 seasons with Millonarios, he scored 120 goals in 336 league games. Iguarán returned to Cúcuta Deportivo and retired from playing at age 40, making him one of the oldest players in Colombian league history.

International career
Iguarán is also considered one of the best players ever in the Colombia national team, where he previously held the goalscoring record with 25 goals in 68 games between 1979 and 1993, until it was tied by Radamel Falcao in 2015. One of the most memorable victories he had while playing at the Colombian team was in the 1991 Copa América, where they defeated Brazil 2–0, the first goal was scored by Antony de Ávila, and the second one was scored by the "El Guájiro" Iguarán himself, in the 66th minute of the match.

Since 1991, Iguarán had been considered Colombia's all-time goal scorer with 25 goals until Radamel Falcao tied him in 2015. During Falcao's 24th goal in a friendly match against Kuwait, a match commentator on Colombian television claimed that Falcao had tied Iguarán at 24 goals sparking a nationwide debate on whether Iguarán had scored 24 or 25 goals. The controversy stems from a 1988 friendly match against the United States in which Iguarán scored both of the game's goals. However, video evidence suggests that one of the goals deflected off teammate Alexis García. Regardless, the match report credited Iguarán with both goals and both FIFA and the Colombian Football Federation have Iguarán on record with 25 goals. When interviewed by Colombian radio about the controversy Iguarán said, "In my records I have 25 and the Federation has 25 as well. Anyway, I don't worry about that and I won't lose any sleep over it. I think that all records are meant to be broken and this one was not going to be the exception. Someday, another striker had to come and break it and truthfully it is an honor that it's Falcao, a player I much admire."

Legacy
After his retirement in the 1990s, a football academy was founded in his honor by his brother Camilo Iguarán.

Career statistics
Scores and results list Colombia's goal tally first, score column indicates score after each Iguarán goal.

Honours
Deportivo Táchira
Venezuelan Primera División: 1981

Millonarios
Categoría Primera A: 1987, 1988

Individual
Copa America Golden Boot: 1987

Notes

References

External links

Website of the Arnoldo Iguarán football academy 

1957 births
Living people
Colombian footballers
Colombian expatriate footballers
Colombia international footballers
1979 Copa América players
1983 Copa América players
1987 Copa América players
1989 Copa América players
1990 FIFA World Cup players
1991 Copa América players
Categoría Primera A players
Millonarios F.C. players
Deportes Tolima footballers
Cúcuta Deportivo footballers
Independiente Santa Fe footballers
Atlético Junior footballers
Deportivo Táchira F.C. players
Expatriate footballers in Venezuela
Association football forwards
People from La Guajira Department